Mercedes Pinto Armas (La Laguna, Tenerife, 12 October 1883 – Ciudad de México, 21 October 1976) was a Spanish writer. Her 1926 novel He is the basis of the Luis Buñuel film Él (This Strange Passion, 1952).

Works
Plays : “Un señor cualquiera” (1930), “Silencio” (1929), “Una mujer, Ana Rosa” (1932).
Poems : “Brisas del Teide” (1921), “Cantos de muchos puertos” (1940), “Más alto que el águila” (1968).
Essay : “La emoción de Montevideo” (1949).
Novels : “Él” (1926), “Ella” (1934), “El alma grande del pequeño Juan” (1950).
Film : "El coleccionista de cadáveres" (1966), "Días de viejo color" (1967).

References

1883 births
1976 deaths
People from San Cristóbal de La Laguna
Spanish women writers
Spanish emigrants to Mexico
Mexican people of Canarian descent
Writers from the Canary Islands